Roubidoux is an extinct town in the Salem Plateau region of the Ozarks located in northwest Texas County, Missouri, United States. The GNIS classifies it as a populated place. The townsite is located at the confluence of the east and west forks of Roubidoux Creek.

A post office called Roubidoux was established in 1850, and remained in operation until 1953. The community took its name from nearby Roubidoux Creek.

References

Ghost towns in Missouri
Former populated places in Texas County, Missouri